Spilomyia gratiosa is a species of Hoverfly in the family Syrphidae.

Distribution
Argentina, Brazil.

References

Eristalinae
Insects described in 1888
Diptera of South America
Taxa named by Frederik Maurits van der Wulp